Ebrahimabad (also Romanized as Ebrāhīmābād) is a village in Miankuh Rural District, in the Central District of Mehriz County, Yazd Province, Iran. At the 2006 census, its population was 42, in 16 families.

References 

Populated places in Mehriz County